SriCharan Rangarajan (born 24 April 1981) is an Indian actor and a qualified lawyer based in Chennai, India.

Career 
Having debuted in the 2008 Tamil film Mudhal Mudhal Mudhal Varai, Sri Charan went on to make his break with Radha Mohan's 2011 film Payanam or Gaganam where he acted in a double role. He then portrayed a supporting role in the Siddharth starrer 180 directed by Jayendra. He played the role of a guy next door, a radio jockey in San Francisco, United States.

Filmography 
Actor

As dubbing artist

References

1986 births
Male actors from Chennai
Male actors in Tamil cinema
Living people
20th-century Indian lawyers
21st-century Indian lawyers